The Elizabeth C. Stanton class transport ship was a transport class of the United States Navy that originated just prior to the second World War. The class,  which contained only four ships, is named for Elizabeth Cady Stanton.

See also
List of U.S. military vessels named after women

 

Elizabeth C. Stanton-class transports
Auxiliary transport ship classes